An Enlightenment Intensive is a group retreat designed to enable a spiritual enlightenment experience within a relatively short time. Devised by Americans Charles Berner and his wife, Ava Berner, in the 1960s. The format combines the self-enquiry meditation method popularised by Ramana Maharshi with interpersonal communication processes such as the dyad structure of co-counselling in a structure that resembles both a traditional Zen sesshin (meditation retreat) and group psychotherapy. Religious teachings and philosophical concepts are generally avoided.

Origins 
Charles Berner (1927 – 2007), who was later known as  Yogeshwar Muni, created the Enlightenment Intensive.  In the 1960s, he formed the Institute of Ability where he and his wife Ava promoted “holistic health techniques such as fasting and massage, communication exercises like those used in encounter groups, emotional release therapies, past life regression, and a host of other modalities popular among the 1960s counterculture.” 

Berner was known for his skills in helping people improve their life.  He taught that honest communication and understanding between one’s self and others was the path to improved relationships, enlightenment and fulfilling the purpose of Life.

Charles Berner had observed that those who were most identified with their self-image, ego or personality tended not to make much progress in personal therapy, which may require flexibility.

Mystics who practise insight or jnana yoga report a momentary change of consciousness bringing a direct experience of the reality or truth of self or of others, or of existence, such as is known in various traditions as kensho, satori or samadhi. But traditional techniques for this realisation depend upon a monastic or eremitic life difficult to attain for the average Westerner.

In spring 1968, it "just suddenly occurred" to Charles Berner - "what source it came from I know not but it wasn't a process of sitting down and figuring it out" - to combine meditation methods with the structure of an interpersonal workshop.

The first experimental Enlightenment Intensive was held soon afterwards in the California desert with Charles and Ava Berner. Bill Savoie, in an unpublished book, The Bridge to One, writes that “in May 1968 Charles announced we would have a 5 day Enlightenment Intensive. We would just go for it and see what would happen. Charles had a community of about 150 people who would stay connected with his teachings. At that first Enlightenment Intensive there were 26 people. Both Peggy and I were there."

“The Enlightenment Intensive retreat that Berner created in 1968 grew out of his interest and research with using interpersonal communication to facilitate the enlightened state and personal growth.  Berner wondered if there were more effective ways to accelerate spiritual development and personal growth for his students and clients.” 

Berner combined the 10,000 year old self inquiry meditation, ‘Who Am I’, with a 20th Century western communication technique developed by Ava Berner called the relating dyad.  The result that Berner and his students discovered was that this combination increased consciousness and quickened the process of enlightenment.

“Presentation is the technique used by us,” writes Berner in a booklet titled, Enlightenment.  “By continual interaction with another, by presenting continually to another the results of contemplation of the nature of one’s self, the process of enlightenment is accelerated.  One maintains his state of increased consciousness because it is achieved while in contact with another, and so one is in Life and the enlightenment is useful.”(5) This was a major discovery in the history enlightenment techniques.

Berner ran dozens over the next few years, gradually refining the format and method, optimising the retreat for the "weekend truth-seeker". He also trained others to lead groups. His 99th Enlightenment Intensive was held in Berkeley in 1975 and he held several more in the late 1970s at his ashram in St. Helena, California, known as Kayavarohana West.

Structure 
The typical intensive is three days long. There are also longer Enlightenment Intensives (e.g., seven days, two weeks, six weeks) using essentially the  same format as a three-day. They are led by a "master" or "facilitator" whose role is to set up the retreat, ensure it runs smoothly and provide participants with information, support and encouragement, both as a whole and individually. It has a set of rules designed to ensure a single-minded focus on the purpose of the retreat.

A typical day starts early in the morning and lasts until late in the evening. The day usually consists of a single structure interspersed with eating, washing, exercise, work and meditation. Each day there are ten to twelve 40-minute periods where participants work in dyads, rotating partners, giving an instruction, chosen by the participant or the master/facilitator, often called a koan. The most usual instructions are "tell me who you are", "tell me what you are", "tell me what life is" or "tell me what another is".

One partner gives the instruction to the other and listens intently without any response. The "talking" partner looks for a direct experiential answer and reports it to their partner. This continues for 5 minutes when, in response to a bell or chime, the "talking" partner becomes the "listening" partner for 5 minutes. After 40 minutes there is a break before resuming with another partner.

When participants have a direct experience of great clarity, they may present an answer to the master/facilitator. The participant then continues, either with another instruction or the same instruction.

There may be a period on the last day to support integration of the experience into daily life. There may also be a follow-up meeting after some days.

Influence
Enlightenment Intensives are now held in many countries around the world. They may be offered as a "stand-alone" process outside any tradition, movement or organization. There are also numerous derivative processes going by different names, perhaps involving some alteration of the format.

References

Further reading 
Love, J. (1979) The 72 hour mirror, the Enlightenment Intensive Process. by Jeff Love. Guerneville, California: Inner Ed. Reprinted April 1986 by Origin, Star Route, Sattley, California. 59 pgs. (ASIN B000N6B0GY)
Noyes, L. (1998), The Enlightenment Intensive: Dyad Communication as a Tool for Self-Realization. North Atlantic Books.
Berner, C.; (2014), Enlightenment and the Enlightenment Intensive:Volume 1;Amazon Books;
Berner, C.; (2014), Enlightenment and the Enlightenment Intensive:Volume 2;Amazon Books;
Berner,C.;(2015)Relating and Spiritual Consciousness;Amazon Books;
Wexler,Y.;(2014) Knowing Your Self: 100 Dyad Exercises for Awakening; Amazon Books;

External links 
Enlightenment Intensive Retreats around the world 

Meditation
Spiritual retreats
Large-group awareness training